Jovan Vavic (born ) is the former head coach of both the University of Southern California (USC) men's and women's water polo teams. In 2012, he was interim head coach of the United States men's national water polo team. While coaching USC he won the National Coach of the Year award 15 times, and the Mountain Pacific Sports Federation Coach of the Year award 13 times. He was fired by USC in March 2019 in the wake of his indictment in the 2019 college admissions bribery scandal. After his indictment, Vavic was arrested on charges of accepting at least $250,000 in bribes. In April 2022, he was convicted of fraud and bribery. However, the conviction was later overturned and a new trial ordered.

Early and personal life
Vavic was born in former SFR Yugoslavia, republic of SR Montenegro. He grew up in Herceg Novi, SR Montenegro, and emigrated to the United States in 1984.  Vavic graduated from UCLA (bachelor's degree in history, 1992). He and his wife, whom he married in 1990, have four children. He is a resident of Rancho Palos Verdes, California.

Water polo coaching career
From 1987 to 1990, Vavic coached water polo at Palos Verdes High School.

Vavic was the head coach of the U.S. water polo team at the 1995 World University Games in 2003. In 2012, he was interim head coach of the United States men's national water polo team.

He became a coach at University of Southern California (USC) in 1992, and was the head coach of the USC Trojans men's and women's water polo teams. Vavic led both teams to national championships three times in the same school year. He won the National Coach of the Year award 15 times, and the Mountain Pacific Sports Federation Coach of the Year award 13 times. In 2015 he was named Pac-12 Coach of the Century. His teams won 16 national titles, including 1998, 2003, 2005, and 2008 with the USC men's water polo teams. Vavic coached 14 Peter J. Cutino Award winners. Among the Olympians he coached were J. W. Krumpholz, Flora Bolonyai, Anni Espar, McQuin Baron, and Thomas Dunstan.

Indictment in bribery scandal and Trial

Vavic was arrested and indicted in March 2019 in the 2019 college admissions bribery scandal. He was accused of signing two "recruits" who had never actually played competitive water polo, to help the students gain admission to USC, in exchange for $250,000 in bribes from the students' parents. In additions to these charges, Vavic was also accused of helping recruit other coaches into the student admissions bribery scheme as well. He was charged with conspiracy to commit racketeering. The charge carries penalties of a prison term of up to 20 years, and up to $250,000 in fines.

Vavic was fired by USC in the immediate wake of his indictment. On March 12, 2019, Vavic was arrested. Vavic's supervisor, senior assistant USC athletic director Donna Heinel, would be fired and arrested the same day as well. Following his arrest, Vavic put his Ranchos Palos Verdes home on the market and offered to sell it for $2.499 million.

On March 10, 2022, Vavic's criminal trial officially began in a Boston federal court. On April 8, 2022, a federal jury in Boston convicted Vavic of fraud and bribery. On September 15, 2022, Boston-based U.S. District Judge Indira Talwani overturned Vavic's convicted and ordered for a new trial to take place. Talwani cited the significance of USC accepting payment from the students’ families as a reason for overturning the conviction, and that evidence did not show that the payments “served the defendants’ interests and harmed the university’s.”

References 

American water polo coaches
Living people
Montenegrin sports coaches
People from Herceg Novi
People from Palos Verdes Estates, California
University of California, Los Angeles alumni
USC Trojans men's water polo
Yugoslav sportspeople
Year of birth missing (living people)